Silviu-Ionuț Manea (born April 5, 1983) is a Romanian endurance sports athlete.

Manea was born in Zărnești, and attended the Liceul Silvic din Braşov. He also competes in mountain biking, mountain running, duathlon and triathlon events.

Selected results

Ski mountaineering 
 2001
 1st, National Championship (ind.)
 1st, National Championship (team)
 2002
 1st, National Championship (ind.)
 1st, National Championship (team)
 1st, Balkan Championship
 11th, World Championships of Ski Mountaineering
 2003
 1st, National Championship
 1st, Balkan Championship
 2nd, European Championship of Ski Mountaineering
 2nd, Brigade Skimeisterschaft
 2004:
 1st, National Championship
 1st, Brigade Skimeisterschaft
 5th, World Championship of Ski Mountaineering
 7th, World Championship relay race (together with Ionuț Gălițeanu, Péter Károly and Lucian Clinciu)
 2005:
 1st, National Championship
 1st, Brigade Skimeisterschaft
 1st, World Cup of Ski Mountaineering
 5th, European Championship (individual)
 5th, European Championship (vertical race)
 7th, World Cup of Ski Mountaineering
 8th, European Championship relay race (together with Ionuț Gălițeanu, Rareș Manea and Lucian Clinciu)
 2006
 1st, National Championship
 5th, European Cup
 7th, World Championship of Ski Mountaineering
 2007:
 1st, National Championship
 8th, European Championship relay race (together with Dimitru Frâncu, Rareș Manea and Ionuț Gălițeanu)
 21st, European Championship (individual)
 21st, World Cup of Ski Mountaineering
 26th, European Championship (vertical race)
 2008:
 1st, National Championship - Sinaia Winter Race 2008
 1st: Postăvaru Nigh
 1st, Balkan Championship
 2009:
 1st:  Postăvaru Night
 1st,  Brigade Skimeisterschaft
 1st,  Cupa Poiana Zanelor
 1st,  Concurs Memorial Mike Csaba
 26th, World Cup of Ski Mountaineering
 2010:
 1st, Cupa Muntele Mare (high mountain cup)
 1st: Postavaru Night
 2011:
 2nd, Postavaru Night
 2012:
 1st,  Bucegi Winter Race
 1st,  Postavaru Night
 1st,  Cupa memorială Zoli Buzasi
 1st,  Cupa Vlădeasa
 2nd,  Zwieselalm Aufstieg (Austria)
 11th, Bergfex Sprinter (Austria)
 16th, Knauf Stoderzinken Challenge (Austria)
 2013:
 2nd, Mountain Attack Tour
 1st, Cupa Honey Energy
 1st, Semenic Vertical Race
 1st, Bucegi Winter Race
 2nd, Postăvaru Night
 2014:
 1st,  Postăvaru Night
 1st,  Parângul Night Challenge
 1st,  Bucegi Winter Race
 1st,  Cupa Călimani
 3rd,  City Speed Up, Bischofshofen (Austria)
 5th,  Knauf Stoderzinken Challenge (Austria)
 5th,  Kampstein Schitourenlauf
 8th,  Mountain Attack Tour (Austria)
 10th, Laserzlauf (Austria)

Mountain running 
 2005:
 11th, Red Bull Dolomitenmann (Austria)
 12th, Red Bull Cape Tawn Man (Africa de Sud)
 2006:
 2nd, Piatra Craiului Mountains|Piatra Craiului marathon
 2007:
 3rd, Piatra Craiului marathon
 2008:
 2nd, Piatra Craiului marathon
 2009:
 1st, Piatra Craiului marathon
 2012:
 1st, Ultra Trail Făgăraș
 2013:
 1st, Ultra Trail Făgăraș
 1st, Cheile Rasnoavei Adventure Semimaraton
 2nd, Piatra Craiului marathon
 2nd, Azuga Trail Race
 2nd, Honey Energy Vertical Race

Mountain biking 
 2008:
 2nd, Geiger Mountain Bike Challenge
 1st, Cupa Conpet
 2009:
 1st, Alpin Sport MTB Marathon
 2nd, Geiger Mountain Bike Challenge
 2010:
 1st, Argeș County|Argeș Winter Race
 2nd, Geiger Mountain Bike Challenge
 2nd, Mediaș half marathon
 2nd, Surmont MTB Challenge
 2nd, 3 Mountains Marathon
 2012:
 1st, Trofeul Chindiei (MTB)
 2nd, XCM Brasov (MTB)
 2nd, On Top of The World
 3rd, Geiger MTB Challenge
 2nd, Maros MTB
 2013:
 1st, 3 Mountains Marathon (M>30 ani)
 2nd, XCM Brasov MTB (M>30 ani)

Duathlon 
 2008:
 1st, Cetatea Brașovului duathlon
 2009:
 1st, Cetatea Brașovului duathlon
 2010:
 3rd, Cetatea Brașovului duathlon
 2011:
 2nd, Duatlon Țara Bârsei
 2012:
 1st, Cetatea Brașovului duathlon
 1st, Duatlon Țara Bârsei
 2013:
 1st, Cetatea Brașovului duathlon
 2nd, Duatlon Țara Bârsei

Triathlon 
 1st, Fără Asfalt triathlon

External links 
 Silviu Manea at skimountaineering.org

References 

1983 births
Living people
Romanian male ski mountaineers
Romanian male long-distance runners
Marathon mountain bikers
People from Zărnești